Adult Film Database (AFD) is an English-language adult website database that attempts to keep records of all pornographic movies and adult film stars. This includes filmographies, partial biographies, reviews, labeled and categorized adult film stills, as well as a regularly updated adult industry blog which features the latest news about adult performers, movies, directors, studios, web site updates and sundry adult news from around the world.

Founding and synopsis
It was created in 1991 under the name Sodomite by a college student. This was an attempt to fill the void of the temporary absence of the Internet Adult Film Database (IAFD) and as a project in web development. In 1999 its name was changed to the AdultFilmDatabase.com. Today, the AdultFilmDatabase.com is a major competitor to the Internet Adult Film Database.

Taking inspiration from both the Internet Adult Film Database and IMDb and forging ties with industry mainstays like Vivid Entertainment, Hustler, Wicked and Digital Playground the AdultFilmDatabase.com features information on over 100,000 adult movies and 60,000 performers (updated March 2019).

Run by a husband and wife team, the Adult Film Database was the first online adult database to include both straight and gay videos and performers.

On October 1, 2007, the Adult Film Database was mentioned in an article from the online equivalent of Brazilian newspaper Folha de S.Paulo.

In October 2007, the Adult Film Database debunked rumors adult film performer Tamara Lee (born 30 July 1969) had died from AIDS. The news was covered by Adult Video News (AVN) in an article on October 23, 2007.

References

External links 

 
 http://www.adultfilmdatabase.com

Erotica and pornography websites
Internet properties established in 1991
Internet properties established in 1999
Online film databases
Works about pornography